The Beall Park Community Center, at 409 N. Bozeman in Bozeman, Montana, was built in 1927.  It was listed on the National Register of Historic Places in 1987.

It was a work of architect W.R. Plew and was deemed an excellent example of Craftsman architecture.

References

		
National Register of Historic Places in Gallatin County, Montana
Buildings and structures completed in 1927
American Craftsman architecture in Montana
Buildings and structures in Bozeman, Montana
1927 establishments in Montana
Community centers in Montana
Bungalow architecture in Montana